Ernesto Alciati (3 December 1902 – 27 September 1984) was an Italian long-distance runner. He participated in the 1924 Summer Olympics marathon but did not finish.

Biography
He competed in the marathon at the 1924 Summer Olympics but did not finish the race  Alciati's personal best in the marathon was 2:50:43 established in 1924. His athletic club was Associazione Podistica Liberi Astigiani (Running Association Free Astigians).

Alciati is one of five athletes born in the town of Asti who have participated in the Olympic Games. The others are pole-vaulter Silvio Fraquelli, basketball player Luca Garri, racewalker Rossella Giordano and bobsledder Matteo Torchio.

Achievements

See also
Italy at the 1924 Summer Olympics

References

External links
 

1902 births
1984 deaths
Athletes (track and field) at the 1924 Summer Olympics
Italian male long-distance runners
Italian male marathon runners
Olympic athletes of Italy
People from Asti
Sportspeople from the Province of Asti